Defoe is a surname. Its origin is uncertain, it may be a variation of Foe or Fow or an Anglicized form of a French name, possibly Thevoz, Thevoux, de Vaux or Devaux, Dufau or Dufou. Notable people with the surname include:

Annette DeFoe (1890–1960), American silent film actress
Daniel Defoe (c. 1660–1731), English trader, writer, and journalist best known for writing Robinson Crusoe
David Defoe (born 1949), Dominican-Dutch cricketer
Gideon Defoe (born 1975), author of Pirates!
Jermain Defoe (born 1982), English footballer

Notes

See also
Dafoe
DeFeo